Greater may refer to:

Greatness, the state of being great
Greater than, in inequality
Greater (film), a 2016 American film
Greater (flamingo), the oldest flamingo on record
"Greater" (song), by MercyMe, 2014
Greater Bank, an Australian bank
Greater Media, an American media company

See also